Calochortus exilis is a rare Mexican species of plants in the lily family. It is native to mountains in the State of Hidalgo in east-central Mexico.

Description
Calochortus exilis is a bulb-forming herb up to 15 cm tall, usually unbranched. Flowers are nodding (hanging) with yellow or purple sepals and white to lemon-yellow petals.

References

External links
Pacific Bulb Society, Calochortus Species Three photos of several species including Calochortus exilis

exilis
Flora of Hidalgo (state)
Plants described in 1911